KCSU may refer to:

KCSU-FM, a radio station (90.5 FM) licensed to Fort Collins, Colorado, United States 
King's College Student Union